The 2022–23 LEB Oro season is the 27th season of the Spanish basketball second league. It started on 7 October 2022 with the first round of the regular season and will end on 18 June 2023 with the Final Four.

Teams

Promotion and relegation (pre-season) 
A total of 18 teams contest the league, including 13 sides from the 2021–22 season, two relegated from the 2021–22 ACB and two promoted from the 2021–22 LEB Plata.

Teams relegated from Liga ACB
 MoraBanc Andorra
 Hereda San Pablo Burgos

Teams promoted from LEB Plata
 Grupo Alega Cantabria CBT
 Bueno Arenas Albacete Basket
 Hereda Ourense

Venues and locations

Personnel and sponsorship

Managerial changes

Regular season

League table

Results

Copa Princesa de Asturias 
The Copa Princesa de Asturias will be played on 10–11 February 2023, by the top two qualified teams after the end of the first half of the season (round 17). The champion of the cup will play the playoffs against the ninth qualified if it finish the league between the second and the fifth qualified.

Teams qualified

Game

Awards
All official awards of the 2022–23 LEB Oro season.

Player of the round

Regular season

References

External links 
 Official website 

LEB
LEB Oro seasons
Second level Spanish basketball league seasons
2022–23 in European second tier basketball leagues